The British Empire XIII was a rugby league football team in that played a fixture against New Zealand in 1952 at Stamford Bridge.

List of  players

Trevor Allan
Robert "Bob" Ayres
William "Billy" Banks
Robert Bartlett
Frank Barton
Harry Bath
Brian Bevan
Harry Beverley
Charles "Charlie" Booth
John "Jack" Broome
Arthur Clues
Lionel Cooper
Jack Cunliffe
John "Jack" Daly
Pat Devery
Alf Fiddes (Albert Fildes/Alexander Fiddes)
Hector Gee
Eric Harris
Vic Hey
Alec Higgins
Johnny Hunter
Dan McKeating
Vince McKeating
Tom McKinney
Robert "Bob" McMaster(s)
John "Rupert" Mudge
Tony Paskins
Albert Pepperell
Alan Prescott
Gus Risman
Charles Smith
Jim Sullivan
Lawrence Thacker
Dave Valentine
Ernest Ward

Alf “Ginger” Burnell

See also
Other Nationalities rugby league team
Rugby League XIII team

References
Programme from game versus New Zealand 1952
British Pathe news footage

National rugby league teams
History of the British Empire